Pioltello is a comune (municipality) in the Metropolitan City of Milan in the Italian region Lombardy, located about  northeast of Milan.

Pioltello borders the following municipalities: Cernusco sul Naviglio, Vimodrone, Segrate, Rodano, Peschiera Borromeo, Vignate.
  
Pioltello is served by Pioltello-Limito railway station. Among the churches, is the baroque-style, Roman Catholic Chiesa della Immacolata.

Physical geography 
Located about 6 kilometers east of Milan , the territory is between the SP ex SS 11 Padana Superiore (to the north, located between Cernusco sul Naviglio and Cassina de 'Pecchi ) and the SP 14 Rivoltana (to the south, located between Rodano and Vignate ) and is arranged along the north south axis, with an east west width of a couple of kilometers. This long and narrow stripe conformation is the result of the history of the city, born from the merger on 1 January 1870 of two up to that time independent municipalities: Pioltello and Limito. From the time until today, the territory between the two historic centers has been almost completely urbanized, with the birth of the Seggiano district.

The long and narrow strip is cut by several crossings: the SP 103 Cassanese between Pioltello and Vignate and the Ferdinandea railway , always between Limito and Vignate. The new Porta railway station is under construction , one of the three planned in the Milan area, together with Rogoredo and Rho-Pero. Pioltello is also the terminus of the S6 line of the Milan suburban railway service .

South of the SP 14 Rivoltana since the 70s the residential district of San Felice has risen, extending the urbanized area towards the south and thus bringing the Rivoltana within the urban fabric of the city even if only a small part (only 2 streets) is part of the municipality of Pioltello. In recent years, always south of the SP 14 Rivoltana , the new Malaspina locality has developed on the border with San Felice , which until a few years ago was only the seat of the Niccolò Machiavelli Liceo Scientifico, while now it has become a new and modern residential center. on the edge of the so-called Bosco della Besozza (one of the city parks). Since 2009, the Italian headquarters of the multinational have been transferred to this location3M , located first in nearby San Felice .

Despite the vicissitudes that Pioltello suffered, particularly in the 1960s and 1970s , with a very strong population growth and the birth of low-cost and low-quality residential districts, Pioltello still has large agricultural and green areas, which divide it from Milan and Segrate and bring it closer to the Municipalities of Martesana , of which it is geographically part.

Pioltello and the three parks 
Since 1999 Pioltello has acquired the title of city and the motto with which Pioltello currently presents itself is the city of three parks , where the three parks mentioned are the Parco delle Cascine (defined with a resolution by the former Province of Milan PLIS: Local Park of Supracomunale interest), the Trenzanesio Park (Villa Invernizzi) and the Bosco della Besozza , the latter owned by the municipality and on which one of the urban forests financed by the Lombardy Region is rising .

History 
The first document that instead mentions the modern Pioltello still in the Plautellum form dates back to 1020: the place was in fact inhabited for centuries, as evidenced by the discovery in 2009 of a small necropolis dating back to 300 AD near the current town of Seggiano . The other historic district of the city, Limito , is attested by the same source to 1071. Both locations are documented without interruption to this day.

In 1745 the architect Carlo Giuseppe Merlo started work on the facade of the parish church of Sant'Andrea Apostolo, which was completed in 1753.

In the Napoleonic era Pioltello became the capital of a district comprising about forty municipalities of the current Martesana .

In 1869 it was hypothesized the constitution of a Grande Pioltello comprising Briavacca , Limito , Rovagnasco , Rodano and Segrate , but the opposition of the local communities led to a more moderate final measure which only involved the annexation of Limito as of 1 January 1870.

Symbols 
The coat of arms of the Municipality of Pioltello represents both its territorial position (east Milan) and some episodes of its history. The first section on the left presents the red cross on a white background, the symbol of Milan, to represent Pioltello's proximity to the capital. The four green bands on a golden field refer to the coat of arms of the illustrious Milanese family of Trivulzio which, starting from 1499, had been the owner of the fief of Melzo , of which Pioltello was part of at the time. Another example of the municipal coat of arms of the area that shows the green and gold colors of the Trivulzio family is Cologno Monzese . The golden lilieson a silver background they would remember the passage and the allocation of French troops on the territory of this Municipality. Finally, the figure of the two crossed swords would allude to the Battle of Cassano d'Adda which took place in the territory of Pioltello in 1259, when the Milanese troops clashed with those commanded by Ezzelino III da Romano.

Honors 

City Title

- Presidential Decree of November 19, 1999

Company 
The history and urban planning of the city have fostered the sense of belonging to the neighborhoods, which territorially coincide in substance with the parishes of San Giorgio (Limito), Sant'Andrea (Pioltello Vecchia), Maria Regina (Pioltello Nuova) and Beata Vergine Assunta (Seggiano).

The social life of the neighborhood and town is quite developed, thanks to the presence of numerous social, cultural and sporting associations that are close to a hundred. To remember, for the importance of the social role played, the presence on the territory of nursery schools of Catholic inspiration. In particular, the Papa Giovanni XXIII Nursery School in the parish of Santa Maria Regina di Pioltello Nuova, the San Martino Kindergarten (1904), which stands at the Old Church of Limito and the Antonio Gorra Kindergarten (1902), which stands in the historic center of Pioltello, both of which have been active for over a hundred years.

The social fabric of the city of Pioltello sees the presence of numerous immigrants , who make up about 24% of the population. In the Satellite district , 30% of the children attending kindergarten and elementary schools are of foreign origin. Most of the immigrants reside in the Satellite district, in the Pioltello Nuova district, and in the Piazza Garibaldi district., in the Seggiano district. The presence of a growing percentage of people with different habits and customs, in a context characterized by marked poverty, contributes to creating a climate of distrust and discomfort in the neighborhoods where this presence is more significant. Public administrations have tackled the phenomenon with initiatives such as the Intercultural Consultation, one of the few experiments in the area of continuous dialogue between foreign communities and Italian citizens.

Two main festivals take place in Pioltello, both of which have recently been established:

 The Festa dello Sport (formerly "Festa Cittadina") , in the first week of June
 The Santa Lucia Fair , in December
 The Caravan Festival of 100 Colors , in May

The patron saint of the city is Sant'Andrea (celebrated on November 30), patron of the oldest parish. For historical reasons, the Marian Jubilee is remembered , which takes place in Pioltello Vecchia every 25 years, continuously since 1780. Another deeply felt religious festival is the procession of Lu Signuri di li Fasci which takes place every Good Friday in Seggiano, where this tradition is it was brought by the numerous original community of Pietraperzia ( Enna ). A Pro Loco has been operating since 2003 .

Demographic evolution 

 900 in 1751
 1 314 in 1771
 1 400 in 1805
 1 471 in 1809 after the annexation of Trenzanesio and Limito
 1 886 in 1811 after the annexation of Briavacca , Lucino and Rodano
 1 821 in 1853
 1,881 in 1861
 2 896 in 1871 after the annexation of Limito

Inhabitants surveyed

Ethnicities and foreign minorities 
According to ISTAT data  as of 1 January 2017, the foreign resident population was 9 009 people, equal to 24% of the population. The nationalities most represented on the basis of their percentage of the total resident population were:

 Romania 1 109
 Ecuador 1 080
 Pakistan 937
 Peru 884
 Egypt 800
 Albania 568
 Morocco 367
 Bangladesh 353
 Philippines 318
 Ukraine 240

In percentage terms, Pioltello is the second largest municipality in the metropolitan city with the highest foreign population. The first among the metropolitan municipalities is Baranzate , with 33% of the foreign population.

Culture 
The cultural panorama of Pioltello is characterized by the presence of some public, private and voluntary agencies, among which we mention:

 the Civic School of Music
 the Alessandro Manzoni Municipal Library
 the UCI Cinemas multiplex cinema
 the MAF Fonderia d'Arte , which moved to Pioltello a few years ago, author of bronze works including one of the doors of the Milan Cathedral and around which an Association of local artists has been established
 Throne of Silence , sculpture in Don Civilini square by the Japanese artist Kyoji Nagatani .

Cinema 
Some parts of the films La vita agra ( 1964 ) by Carlo Lizzani and Delitto d'amore ( 1974 ) by Luigi Comencini were shot in Pioltello.

Economy 
Two large companies have their headquarters in Pioltello: Esselunga (Via Giambologna 1) and the Italian branch of 3M

Crafts 
In the handicraft sector, wrought iron working for public buildings is very widespread and renowned .

Administration

References

External links
 Official website